Glory Umunna  (born Glory Chukwu ) is the Most Beautiful Girl in Nigeria 2009.  She competed in Miss World 2009 in Johannesburg, South Africa. She is Igbo from Abia State.

Umunna is a graduate of the University of Nigeria, Nsukka with a degree in Microbiology. She also has a Masters in Management and Information Systems from Cranfield, UK.  

Despite hailing from Eastern Nigeria, Umunna represented a Northern Nigeria state, Nassarawa, in a final held for the first time in Owerri. At twenty-three, Glory became queen, and speaks some French as well as English and her native Igbo.  

Among Umunna's goals is working with a charity organisation which supports disadvantaged children in her country, and getting involved in the rehabilitation and renovation of children's wards in Nigerian hospitals.  

In July 2011, Umunna married civil engineer Uchechi Umunna,   and the couple are parents to two daughters.

References 

Living people
Most Beautiful Girl in Nigeria winners
People from Anambra State
Year of birth missing (living people)
Igbo beauty pageant contestants
Nigerian beauty pageant contestants
 Igbo people
Miss World 2009 delegates
University of Nigeria alumni